

The Uetz Pelikan is a Swiss four-seat cabin monoplane designed for amateur construction by Walter Uetz.

Design and development
The Pelikan is a four-seat development of the earlier Uetz U2V which had been based on the Jodel D.119. The prototype U3M Pelikan had four-seat cabin with a long transparent canopy. The fixed tail-wheel landing gear U3M is powered by  a  Lycoming O-290 engine and the prototype first flew 21 May 1963, it was followed by a further prototype.

The production variant was designated the U4M which was re-engined with a  Lycoming O-320-A2B engine and the addition of flaps. The company built two aircraft and one other was amateur-built.

Variants
U3M Pelikan
Prototype with a  Lycoming O-290 engine, two built.
U4M Pelikan
Production version with a  Lycoming O-320-A2B engine, two factory-built and one amateur-built.

Specifications (U4M Pelikan)

See also

References

Notes

Bibliography

1960s Swiss civil utility aircraft
Homebuilt aircraft
Low-wing aircraft
Single-engined tractor aircraft
Aircraft first flown in 1963